The following lists events that happened during 1888 in South Africa.

Incumbents
 Governor of the Cape of Good Hope and High Commissioner for Southern Africa: Hercules Robinson.
 Governor of the Colony of Natal: Arthur Elibank Havelock.
 State President of the Orange Free State: Jan Brand (until 14 July), Pieter Jeremias Blignaut (starting 14 July).
 State President of the South African Republic: Paul Kruger.
 Prime Minister of the Cape of Good Hope: John Gordon Sprigg.

Events

March
 13 – De Beers Consolidated Mines Ltd. is founded in Kimberley.

October
 30 – Cecil Rhodes and the British South Africa Company obtains Matabeleland from Lobengula in the Rudd Concession, named after Charles Rudd.

Unknown date
 The Eastern Province Rugby Union is founded.
 The town of Amersfoort is established around a Dutch Reformed Church built in 1876.

Births

Deaths
 26 April – William Wellington Gqoba, author, dies at Lovedale near Alice.
 9 July – Sir Jan Brand, 4th president of the Orange Free State. (b. 1823)

Railways

Locomotives

Two new  locomotive types enter service on the Natal Government Railways (NGR):
 The locomotive named Havelock, built in the Durban workshops and known as Hairy Mary during the Second Boer War, is the first locomotive to be designed and built in South Africa.
 The first five of 100 Class D  tank locomotives, the first in the world to have the Mountain type wheel arrangement.

References

History of South Africa